Nilüfer Göle (born 1953) is a Turkish sociologist and a contemporary Turkish academic who specializes in the political movement of today's educated, urbanized, and religious Muslim women. From 1986 to 2001 a professor at the Boğaziçi University in Istanbul, she is currently Directrice d'études at the École des hautes études en sciences sociales (EHESS), Centre d’Analyse et d’Intervention Sociologiques (CADIS), in Paris. Göle is the author of Interpénétrations: L’Islam et l’Europe and The Forbidden Modern: Civilization and Veiling. Through personal interviews, Göle has developed detailed case studies of young Turkish women who are turning to the tenets of fundamental Islamic gender codes. Her sociological approach, which is underpinned with Socialist and Marxist ideology, has also produced a broader critique of Eurocentrism with regard to emerging Islamic identities at the close of the twentieth century. She has explored the specific topic of covering, as well as the complexities of living in a multicultural world.

She holds French citizenship.

Notes

Selected publications
 Interpénétrations: L’Islam et l’Europe. (Paris: Galaade Editions, 2005).
 “Islamisme et féminisme en Turquie: regards croisés,” in Le foulard islamique en questions (Paris: Éditions Amsterdam, 2004).
 Ed. with Ludwig Ammann, Islam in Sicht. Der Auftritt von Muslimen im öffentlichen Raum. (Bielefeld: Transcript-Verlag, 2004).
 The Forbidden Modern: Civilization and Veiling. (Ann Arbor: University of Michigan Press, 1997).

Further reading
PBS Interview with Nilüfer Göle
Interview with Nilüfer Göle: Shifting Identities and the Stakes of Turkish Democracy

External links
At Centre d'Analyse et d'Intervention Sociologiques
Courses taught by Göle at EHESS (2009-2010)

1953 births
Living people
French people of Turkish descent 
Turkish non-fiction writers
Turkish sociologists
Sociologists of religion
Academic staff of Boğaziçi University
Turkish women writers
Members of the Turkish Academy of Sciences